Sant'Andrea Apostolo is a baroque-style, Roman Catholic parish church located on a hillside in Crespadoro, province of Vicenza, region of Veneto, Italy.

History
A church at the site, dependent on the church of Santa Maria Assunta e San Martino located in Chiampo, is documented since 1297-1303. During the 14th and 15th centuries, it was a parish church for a Germanic population of the area. Construction of the present church took place in 1635-1652.

References

Churches in the province of Vicenza
Baroque architecture in Veneto
17th-century Roman Catholic church buildings in Italy
Roman Catholic churches completed in 1652